Morgaine le Fey is a supervillainess appearing in DC Comics, based on Morgan le Fay, the mythical sorceress and half-sister of King Arthur. She debuted in The Demon vol. 1  #1 (September 1972), and was created by Jack Kirby.

Fictional character biography
Morgaine le Fey is the ancient sorceress of Arthurian legends. Her history is slightly different from the legends, but she is a sorceress gifted in the arts of black magic. In Madame Xanadu #1 (2008), Morgaine (or "Morgana") is revealed as a sister of Nimue Inwudu (the future Madame Xanadu) and Vivienne, the Lady of the Lake. All three women are said to be descended from the "Elder Folk", survivors of the fall of Atlantis that evolved into the Homo magi, explaining Morgaine's affinity for magic. While Nimue is shown as kind and caring about the early, magic-free Homo sapiens, Morgaine exhibits a mean streak, treating the new human breed as little more than playthings, using contempt even towards her kinder little sister.

After several centuries of manipulating humans and taking many lovers (including Julius Caesar), Morgaine sets her sights on Uther Pendragon, High King of Britain. Her advances are rejected, as Uther only has eyes for Igraine, the wife of Duke Gorlois of Cornwall. Seeking to meddle in their lives, Morgaine assumes a magical glamour and disguises herself as one of Igraine's daughters, but this causes her to be exiled from the Elder Folk. Her sister Vivienne gives her shelter on the isle of Avalon. Following the Flashpoint event which alters the timeline of the DC Universe, this history appears to have been revised. In the Demon Knights series, Morgaine and Nimue are biological daughters of Igraine, who is herself identified as a Fae (perhaps of the Elder Folk).

In the early 6th century, Morgaine trains her sisters Morgause and Elaine to be adept with sorcery like her. Following Gorlois' death at Uther's hands, Morgaine blames her half-brother King Arthur (Uther's son) for stealing her and her sisters' birthright. She conspires against him throughout his time on the throne and seeks the destruction of Camelot.

In the waning days of Camelot, Merlin merges his demon familiar Etrigan with a man, Jason Blood, as part of a last-ditch effort to defend the kingdom against Morgaine le Fey's assault. Blood had been an ally of le Fey and is bonded to Etrigan as penance. He and Morgaine become enemies henceforth. Following the fall of Camelot, Morgaine continues to practice her dark arts and retains her youth for many centuries, always seeking more power and a new kingdom to rule. By the 20th century, Merlin has arisen anew and tricks Morgaine, causing her to lose her youth and beauty which she had preserved using her magics. She wishes to replenish her youth with Merlin's secrets. She forces Jason Blood to bond with Etrigan the Demon again and to lead her to Merlin's tomb. Etrigan eventually strives to keep Morgaine le Fey from restoring her youth with the powers of Merlin.

In Batman Family #17, the Huntress's use of the Justice League transporter frees Morgaine le Fey (who captures the Philosopher’s Stone). Le Fey seeks a baby with latent demon powers in the maternity ward where Man-Bat's wife is giving birth. Several women give birth to demon-babies as a result. Etrigan also appears and together he and Man-Bat defeat le Fey (this story takes place in Pre-Crisis on Infinite Earths continuity).

Also in Pre-Crisis continuity, Morgaine's daughter Morgana is one of Wonder Woman's foes, a mischievous young witch. In the Post-Crisis timeline, this character is no longer referenced and Morgaine herself has gone on to become an enemy of Wonder Woman.

Morgaine later attempts to steal Wonder Woman's eternal youth, not realizing that Wonder Woman has already given it up. Her spell backfires and she disintegrates into dust. She retains enough magic for a resurrection, however, and returns to battle the Demon and Wonder Woman on many occasions.

Morgaine returns in the series Trinity, teaming up with a mysterious man called Enigma and the alien warlord Despero to usurp the symbolic position of Superman, Batman, and Wonder Woman. The trio of villains succeed in creating an alternate timeline with their efforts, but the spell is not entirely successful, as this "Despero" is in fact the alien villain Kanjar Ro in disguise, which disrupts Morgaine's enchantment.

While her bid for godhood is disrupted, she nonetheless acquires magical might to enslave the Earth by infusing an already powerful supervillain team with the might of the Major Arcana of the Tarot, giving them a measure of control over reality. As she is part of this Dark Arcana team, as the High Priestess, she has also this measure of control, allowing her to bring Europe and most of Asia Minor under her control, and ultimately lead the forces of good back to America for a final showdown of the powers of the Arcana.

This bid also fails, as the divinely-empowered Trinity of Batman, Superman and Wonder Woman return from their exile and destroy the Dark Arcana's reality-based powers, vanquishing Morgaine's control over Europe. Morgaine, during the part of the series where she enjoys the massive power boost, is portrayed as a power-drunk menace, scorching the Earth as she walks; her powers are used so recklessly and dangerously that even her Dreambound soldiers defect and join forces with the heroes in a plan to bring her down. Ultimately, she seeks the aid of Krona, first, to enslave, and later, to destroy the Earth, as she preferred to have it blasted to nothingness than allow it to remain outside of her control. When this alliance failed, Morgaine offered Krona the soul of Enigma's daughter, causing him to turn on her. Morgaine is defeated, and she is imprisoned in a stone idol, which is placed in the custody of Jason Blood.

During the Brightest Day crossover, Mr. Terrific mentions that Morgaine is among the dozens of magical beings driven insane by the Starheart. According to him, Morgaine was spotted in New Mexico, where she was going on a rampage.

Morgaine appears as a member of Hawkman & Hawkgirl's group The Immortals, advising Kendra Saunders/Lady Blackhawk to use the brain of Anti-Monitor to destroy the Dark Multiverse.

Powers and abilities
 Morgan le Fey is a sorceress skilled in the use of black magic. She has cast spells that are able to control even the strongest of supernatural beings. She was able to transport Wonder Woman to another dimension (the Nether Plane) and fight her for her Amazonian fighting skills. By using a device, she was able to magically view individuals from miles away.
 She is immortal, although she claims to have lost this ability. As shown in the Wonder Woman comic, she must "steal" immortality from other immortals to maintain her youth. After Merlin robs her of her youth and beauty, she wears a golden armor to shield her withered and ancient body. Morgaine also possesses a machine capable of binding beings and stealing their immortal lifeforces.
 Other powers include magic immunity, immunity to telepathy, immunity to power theft through the use of her armor, cancellation of magic and annulment of divine powers.

Other versions

Camelot 3000
An alternate version, with her name spelled Morgan Le Fay, appears in the maxiseries Camelot 3000, where characters from Arthurian myth have no contact with DC superheroes in present day. She organizes an alien invasion to Earth after magically transporting herself to another planet, which also leaves her in the year 3000.

Just Imagine...
In Stan Lee's Just Imagine..., Morgana serves as a secondary antagonist alongside Reverend Darrk in building his Church of Eternal Empowerment. She is also the mother of Adam Strange.

In other media

Television

 Morgaine le Fay appears in series set in the DC Animated Universe, voiced by Olivia d'Abo:
 In the Justice League episode "A Knight of Shadows", she tries to steal the Philosopher's Stone and use it to convert London into a massive castle, with her son Mordred as the ruler, by partially brainwashing Martian Manhunter and having him steal the stone for her in exchange for restoring Mars to life. After reading Etrigan's mind and seeing firsthand Morgaine's betrayal of him, J'onn comes to his senses and crushes the stone to dust, realizing she will not keep her word.
 In Justice League Unlimited, Morgaine le Fay reappears in the episode "Kid Stuff", where she leads Mordred to the Amulet of First Magic, the source of all earthly magic, which had power exceeding even hers. Betrayed by Mordred, who snatched the Amulet and used it to exile her and all adults on Earth to a parallel dimension, she brokered a deal with Batman, Superman, Wonder Woman, and Green Lantern, changing them into children so they could return to Earth and fight Mordred. When they tricked him into becoming an adult so he'd be exiled, he arrived in the parallel dimension where Morgaine told him that he had made a grave error. When the spell was broken, Morgaine changed the heroes back to their proper ages and then proceeded to take care of her son, who was now old and weak though still immortal, having broken the eternal youth spell cast on him centuries ago.
 Morgaine le Fey appears in the Batman: The Brave and the Bold episode "Day of the Dark Knight!", voiced by Tatyana Yassukovich. She uses her magic to take over Camelot and Etrigan, resulting in Merlin gaining help from Batman and Green Arrow. When it came to the location of Excalibur, Morgaine took control of Batman and turned him into a Dark Knight to retrieve Excalibur for her. Merlin engages Morgaine le Fey while Green Arrow is sent to stop Batman from claiming Excalibur for Morgaine. Batman was eventually freed from the spell. With Etrigan also freed, Morgaine transformed into a dragon. When Batman wasn't able to budge, she attacked them and turned Merlin and Etrigan to stone. Green Arrow and Batman pulled Excalibur from the stone and combined their moves to defeat Morgaine le Fey. She also appears in a non-speaking cameo in "The Siege of Starro!", magically manipulating an entrapped Merlin only to be stopped by Etrigan.

Video games
 Morgaine le Fey appears in the DS version of Batman: The Brave and the Bold – The Videogame. She teams up with the Clock King on Dinosaur Island and must be defeated by Batman and Red Tornado.

See also
 Morgan le Fay in popular culture

References

External links
 Justice League Animated Profile
 
 Morgaine le Fey Profile
 Morgaine le Fey Rapsheet
 A brief overview, with links to more detailed treatments, at Camelot in Four Colors
 Morgaine le Fey at DC Database
 Morgan le Fay at Comic Vine

Arthurian comics
Characters created by Jack Kirby
Comics characters introduced in 1972
DC Comics female supervillains
DC Comics fantasy characters
DC Comics witches
DC Comics characters who are shapeshifters
DC Comics characters who can teleport
DC Comics characters who use magic
Fictional characters with absorption or parasitic abilities
Fictional characters with elemental and environmental abilities
Fictional characters with evocation or summoning abilities
Fictional characters with immortality
Fictional characters with precognition
Fictional empaths
Mythology in DC Comics